Equivalent airspeed (EAS) is calibrated airspeed (CAS) corrected for the compressibility of air at a non-trivial Mach number.  It is also the airspeed at sea level in the International Standard Atmosphere at which the dynamic pressure is the same as the dynamic pressure at the true airspeed (TAS) and altitude at which the aircraft is flying. In low-speed flight, it is the speed which would be shown by an airspeed indicator with zero error. It is useful for predicting aircraft handling, aerodynamic loads, stalling etc.

where:

 is actual air density.

 is standard sea level density (1.225 kg/m3 or 0.00237 slug/ft3).

EAS is a function of dynamic pressure.

where:

 is dynamic pressure 

EAS can also be obtained from the aircraft Mach number and static pressure.

where:

 is Mach number

 is static pressure

 is standard sea level pressure (1013.25 hPa)

Combining the above with the expression for Mach number gives EAS as a function of impact pressure and static pressure (valid for subsonic flow):

where:

 is impact pressure.

At standard sea level, EAS is the same as calibrated airspeed (CAS) and true airspeed (TAS). At any other altitude, EAS may be obtained from CAS by correcting for compressibility error.

The following simplified formula allows calculation of CAS from EAS:

where:

pressure ratio: 

The above formula is accurate within 1% up to Mach 1.2 and useful with acceptable error up to Mach 1.5. The 4th order Mach term can be neglected for speeds below Mach 0.85.

See also 

 Acronyms and abbreviations in avionics
 ICAO recommendations on use of the International System of Units
 Calibrated airspeed
 Flight instruments
 Global Positioning System
 Indicated airspeed
 Position error
 True airspeed

References

Bibliography
 Anderson, John D. (2007), Fundamentals of Aerodynamics, Section 3.4 (4th edition), McGraw-Hill, New York USA. 
 Gracey, William (1980), "Measurement of Aircraft Speed and Altitude"  (11 MB), NASA Reference Publication 1046.

External links
 Equivalent airspeed calculator

Airspeed